Ionica Tudor (born 9 January 1975) is a Romanian diver. She competed in the women's 3 metre springboard event at the 1992 Summer Olympics.

References

External links
 

1975 births
Living people
Romanian female divers
Olympic divers of Romania
Divers at the 1992 Summer Olympics
Place of birth missing (living people)